Oshtorak (also Romanized as Āshtark and Āshterk) is a village in Banestan Rural District, in the Central District of Behabad County, Yazd Province, Iran. At the 2006 census, its population was 85, in 22 families.

References 

Populated places in Behabad County